A91 or A-91 may refer to:

 A91 road, a trunk road in Scotland
 Dutch Defence, in the Encyclopaedia of Chess Openings
 A-91, a Soviet bull-pup assault rifle, derived from the 9A-91 carbine